The Yuncheng North railway station is a railway station of Datong–Xi'an Passenger Railway located in Yuncheng, Shanxi, China. It started operation on 1 July 2014, together with the railway.

References

Railway stations in China opened in 2014
Railway stations in Shanxi